Business Versus Love is a 1914 American silent short film directed by Tom Ricketts and written by Sydney Ayres. Starring Edward Coxen, Winifred Greenwood, Harry von Meter, and Jack Richardson.

External links

1914 drama films
1914 films
Silent American drama films
American silent short films
American black-and-white films
1914 short films
Films directed by Tom Ricketts
1910s American films